Franck Berrier (2 February 1984 – 13 August 2021) was a French professional footballer who played as a midfielder, spending much of his career in Belgium.

Career
On 12 May 2010, Berrier left S.V. Zulte Waregem to sign a three-year deal with Standard Liège.

Post-playing career
After retiring in January 2019 due to heart problems, Berrier was hired in the scouting department of KV Mechelen. He left the position on 1 December 2019, when his contract expired.

In March 2020, he joined K.V. Oostende as an assistant coach under Adnan Čustović. The duo left again at the end of the season.

On 12 August 2021, Berrier suffered a heart attack and was then rushed to the hospital in critical condition. The next day, he suffered a second heart attack and died. He was aged 37.

Honours
Standard Liège
Belgian Cup: 2010–11

References

External links
 

1984 births
2021 deaths
French footballers
Association football midfielders
Stade Malherbe Caen players
AS Beauvais Oise players
AS Cannes players
S.V. Zulte Waregem players
Standard Liège players
K.V. Oostende players
K.V. Mechelen players
Ligue 1 players
Championnat National players
Championnat National 2 players
Belgian Pro League players
Challenger Pro League players
People from Argentan
Sportspeople from Orne
Footballers from Normandy